Superficial pustular folliculitis is a superficial folliculitis with thin-walled pustules at the follicular openings.

See also 
 Streptococcal intertrigo
 List of cutaneous conditions

References

External links 
 Special types of folliculitis which should be differentiated from acne, US National Library of Medicine, Published 2017 Sep 27

Bacterium-related cutaneous conditions